Josef "Pepi" Hamerl (22 January 1931 – 15 July 2017) was a former Austrian football player.

Club career
Hamerl played for several clubs, including FC Wien (1952–1955, 1955–1956), Austria Wien (1955), Wiener Sportclub (1956–1961, 1963–1965) and SK Admira Wien (1961–1963). He scored 158 goals in total in the Austrian Football Bundesliga.

International career
He made his debut for Austria in March 1958 against Italy and was a participant at the 1958 FIFA World Cup and the 1960 European Nations' Cup. He earned 9 caps, scoring 2 goals. His last international was a January 1962 match against Egypt.

Honours
 Austrian Football Bundesliga (2):
 1958, 1959

External links

References 
  Player profile – Austria Wien archive

1931 births
2017 deaths
Austrian footballers
Austria international footballers
1958 FIFA World Cup players
FK Austria Wien players
Kapfenberger SV players
Association football forwards